Über alles is the third studio album by American industrial metal band Hanzel und Gretyl, released on May 20, 2003 via Metropolis Records. The album was critically well-received and is generally regarded as the group's most prominent and identifiable work to date. The album is the first of a highly conceptualized trilogy of DIY industrial metal operas that denote a distinct change in style for the group marked by aggressive metal style guitar riffs, gritty orchestral sampling and guttural German spoken vocals.

Critical reception

Rick Anderson of AllMusic said that in spite of the nazi imagery, the album is a "genuinely well-thought-out fusion of techno and industrial sounds with lots of guitars and tight, crunchy beats." Rick Sanchez of IGN said the band "mastered the pounding guitar and sample sound and lifted the genre to an interesting level" and compared the tracks on the album to Motörhead, Megadeth and Rammstein among other acts. Ewan Wadharmi of Hybrid Magazine said of the album that the band "has left a trail of Kraftwerk samples, hardcore riffing and synth buzzing. The booty-shaking beats are creative, and plenty of sirens blast the compound for death-ravers to make the Great X-scape."

In a more critical review, Coreen Wolanski of Exclaim! called the band a "shtick act" and that the album had "nothing more to offer than Rammstein on a bad, bad day."

Track listing 
 "Overture" – 2:44
 "Third Reich from the Sun" – 3:16
 "Ich bin über alles" – 3:06
 "Komm zu uns" – 3:53
 "Mach Schnell" – 3:32
 "SS Deathstar Supergalactik" – 4:03
 "Let the Planets Burn"  – 3:24
 "Intermission" – 1:06
 "11:11" – 2:32
 "Verbotenland" – 4:01
 "Transplutonian Annihilation" – 3:39
 "Mein Kommandant" – 5:51
 "Aufwiedersehen" – 4:16

Credits 
Vas Kallas & Kaizer von Loopy: vocals and instrumentals
Mixed by Bryce Goggin at Trout Studios, New York City
Mastered by Fred Kavorkian at Absolute Audio, New York City

References

External links 
Hanzel und Gretyl's official website
Metropolis Records
Trout Studios

Hanzel und Gretyl albums
2003 albums
Metropolis Records albums
Concept albums